Elachyophtalma dohertyi is a moth in the family Bombycidae. It was described by Walter Rothschild in 1920. It is found on the Tanimbar Islands in Indonesia.

The wingspan is about 37 mm.

References

Bombycidae
Moths described in 1920